The 2002 International Raiffeisen Grand Prix was a men's tennis tournament played on outdoor clay courts in Sankt Pölten in Austria and was part of the International Series of the 2002 ATP Tour. It was the 22nd edition of the tournament and ran from 20 May through 26 May 2002. Second-seeded Nicolás Lapentti won the singles title.

Finals

Singles

 Nicolás Lapentti defeated  Fernando Vicente 7–5, 6–4
 It was Lapentti's only title of the year and the 8th of his career.

Doubles

 Petr Pála /  David Rikl defeated  Mike Bryan /  Michael Hill 7–5, 6–4
 It was Pála's only title of the year and the 2nd of his career. It was Rikl's 1st title of the year and the 23rd of his career.

References

International Raiffeisen Grand Prix
Hypo Group Tennis International
May 2002 sports events in Europe
2002 in Austrian tennis